"It's Time for Love" is a song written by Bob McDill and Hunter Moore, and recorded by American country music artist Don Williams.  It was released in October 1985 as the fourth single from the album Cafe Carolina.  The song reached number 20 on the Billboard Hot Country Singles & Tracks chart.

Chart performance

References

1985 singles
Don Williams songs
Songs written by Bob McDill
Song recordings produced by Garth Fundis
MCA Records singles
1984 songs